This is a list of casinos in Wyoming.

List of casinos

See also

List of casinos in the United States 
List of casino hotels

References

External links

Wyoming
Casinos